Neil Gall (born 1967 in Aberdeen, Scotland) is a London-based painter. He works with processes including modelling, assemblage, photography and painting.  He received his BA in painting at Gray's School of Art and then attended Slade School of Art in London in 1991. He has received awards including the Abby Major Award in 1993 from The British School at Rome, the Jerwood Painting Prize in 1999, and was the artist in residence at Durham Cathedral in 1993.

Selected exhibitions

2008	ScheiblerMitte, Berlin
2008	Something Less, Something More, Gallery One One One, London
2007	Max. Durchfahrtshöhe, ScheiblerMitte, Berlin
2007	Layer Cake, Fabio Tiboni Art Contemporanea, Bologna
2007	Small Wonders, The Grey Gallery, London
2006	World Gone Mad, Milton Keynes Art Gallery, Milton Keynes, traveled to Herbert Read Gallery, Canterbury and Lime House Arts Foundation, London
2005	Atoll Villas, Hales Gallery, London
2004	Tubeway Army, Keih Talent Up West
2004	Obstractivist, Hales Gallery, London
2003	Blow up, St. Paul's Gallery, Birmingham
2001	Model Paintings, Agnews, London
1999	Equinox, Cain Gallery, Nailsworth
1999	Jerwood Painting Prize 1999, Jerwood Gallery, London

Publications
2007 Neil Gall, Shelf Life, Published 2007, Publisher, Black Dog Publishing

Collections
Aberdeen City Art Gallery
Royal Scottish Academy, Edinburgh
Unilever
Simmons & Simmons
Hiscox
Felstad
Insinger de Beaufort
The Lodeveans Collection
Various Private Collections

External links
Shelf Life
Neil Gall at Fabio Tiboni
Neil Gall at Aurel Scheibler

References

Sources
Neil Gall- The Outward Urge
Neil Gall

1967 births
Living people
Alumni of Gray's School of Art
Alumni of the Slade School of Fine Art
Artists from Aberdeen